Carved by Glaciers is the debut EP by American band Lymbyc Systym, released in 2006 on Magic Bullet Records.  It was reissued in 2009 with two new bonus tracks.

Track listing

References

2006 debut EPs
Lymbyc Systym albums
Mush Records albums